The UN General Assembly in December 2008 authorized the establishment of  the  Office of Staff Legal Assistance (OSLA)  to strength "professional legal assistance for staff" to succeed the Panel of Counsel.  OSLA has offices  in New York, Addis Ababa, Beirut, Geneva and Nairobi.

OSLA Staff
OSLA has  permanent  staff  consisting of  10: Chief of Unit (P-5), one Legal Officer (P3), one Legal Officer (P-2) and three Legal Assistants (General Service) in New York, and one Legal Officer(P-3) each in Addis Ababa, Beirut, Geneva and Nairobi.  In addition  it employs lawyers paid for by  contributions by staff members.  The  OSLA staff  is expected to  regulate  the "activity of internal and external individuals providing legal assistance to staff to ensure their independence and impartiality"

Responsibilities
OSLA  is expected to   provide   legal assistance to staff, including summary legal advice; advice and representation during informal dispute resolution including formal mediation; assistance with the management evaluation review and during the disciplinary process; and representation of staff before the Dispute and Appeals Tribunals.

Cases  by OSLA

UNDT-UNAT
During 2013, OSLA represented staff members in the UNDT in  71, and   34  out of the 125 cases of appeal  judged by UNAT.

Cases in UNDT handled by OSLA by country
The highest number of cases by nationality that OSLA represented  in 2013 were: US  41; Russian Federation 29;  Kenya 19: United Kingdom 12;  France 11; Liberia 13; Germany and China 10 each.

Cases by gender
In 2013,  OSLA handled  448 cases from male staff members and 314 from female staff members, about 41 and 59 percent respectively.

References

United Nations General Assembly subsidiary organs
International law organizations
Organizations established by the United Nations
United Nations legislation